Two ships of the Royal Navy have borne the name HMS Grenade:

  was a G-class destroyer launched in 1935 and sunk in 1940.
 HMS Grenade (G53) was a  ordered in 1943 and cancelled in 1944 before she was laid down.

References

Royal Navy ship names